The simple station Avenida El Dorado is part of the TransMilenio mass-transit system of Bogotá, Colombia, opened in the year 2000.

Location 
The station is located north of downtown Bogotá, specifically on Avenida NQS with Carrera 36.

History 
This station opened in 2005 as part of the second line of phase two of TransMilenio construction, opening service to Avenida NQS. It serves the demand of Calle 26 and the Palermo district.

Station services

Old trunk services

Trunk services

Dual services

Feeder routes 
This station does not have connections to feeder routes.

Inter-city service 
This station does not have inter-city service.

See also 
 List of TransMilenio Stations

TransMilenio